Roadsinger is the thirteenth studio album by Yusuf (formerly known as Yusuf Islam  and as Cat Stevens). Roadsinger is Yusuf's second mainstream release since his return to music. The album made its debut on the US Billboard 200 at position No. 41 and on the UK Albums Chart at No. 10.

History
The album was released by Island Records in the UK. It was released in the US by reissue label Hip-O Records and is catalogued under A&M Records. Hip-O Records also reissues Cat Stevens' A&M releases from the 1970s, hence Roadsinger is an addition to his A&M catalogue.

"Everytime I Dream" was inspired by the media criticism of Yusuf Islam following his alleged support for the fatwa issued by Ayatollah Khomeini on Salman Rushdie, the author of The Satanic Verses.

Alun Davies, Yusuf's long-time musical associate, does not feature on the album.

Cover art
On the album cover, the singer is credited as "Yusuf" with a promotional sticker identifying him also as "Cat Stevens".

Track listing
All songs are written by Yusuf.
"Welcome Home" – 4:23
"Thinking 'Bout You" – 2:31
"Everytime I Dream" – 3:09
"The Rain" – 3:26
"World O' Darkness" – 2:23
"Be What You Must" – 3:25
"This Glass World" – 2:02
"Roadsinger" – 4:09
"All Kinds of Roses" – 2:38
"Dream On (Until...)" – 1:56
"Shamsia" – 1:29
"Boots and Sand" (iTunes bonus track, featuring Paul McCartney and Dolly Parton)
"Peace Train Blues" (iTunes bonus track)

Charts

References

External links
Official preview site

2009 albums
Hip-O Records albums
Island Records albums
Yusuf Islam albums
A&M Records albums